Friedrich-Ebert-Platz station is a Nuremberg U-Bahn station. It was the northern terminus of the U3 line from its opening on 10 December 2011 until 2017, when the extension towards Nordwestring opened. It offers interchange to Tramway line 4. Like Aufseßplatz, Hauptbahnhof and Plärrer orange tiles were used in the walls of this station to indicate a possible future interchange station. However, as of 2021 no such interchange to another subway line is planned for the foreseeable future.

Name
The station is named after the square beneath which it lies, which is in turn named after Germany's first Reichspräsident, the SPD politician Friedrich Ebert. Rathenauplatz station is another important Nuremberg U-Bahn station named (indirectly) after a Weimar Republic politician.

References

Nuremberg U-Bahn stations
Railway stations in Germany opened in 2011